Charles Haigt may also refer to:

Charles Haight (1838–1891), American politician in the New Jersey General Assembly (1860–1862) and US House of Representative from New Jersey (1867–1871) 
Charles C. Haight (1841–1917), American architect in New York City.
Charles Sherman Haight Sr. (1870–1938), American Admiralty Expert, Specialist on International Relations in Shipping, founder of boys school and Founder of Seamen's Church Institute of New York and New Jersey
Charles S. Haight Jr. (1930–), American lawyer and federal judge for the United States District Court for the Southern District of New York, son of Charles Sherman Haight Sr.